.ch (.ch; spoken: Punkt CH) was a Swiss German-language free daily newspaper, published in the tabloid format by Media Punkt AG in Zürich between 2007 and 2009.

History
Media Punkt AG first published the paper on 19 September 2007.  The newspaper's name comes from .ch, the Internet's country code top-level domain for Switzerland.

With a claimed initial print run of 435,000, it was one of the largest daily newspapers in Switzerland, according to 2006 statistics. The newspaper was distributed directly to homes in Basel, Bern, Lucerne, St. Gallen and Zürich.  It competed mainly with other free newspapers in Switzerland including 20 Minuten, heute and the News.

The newspaper's editor-in-chief was Rolf Leeb.

The newspaper's chief executive officer was Caroline Thoma.

It ceased publication, because of poor economic performance, with the last issue on 4 May 2009. All 69 employees of the newspaper were laid off.

See also
 List of free daily newspapers
 List of newspapers in Switzerland
 News
 Le Temps
 Heute

References

External links
 punkt.ch (in German), the newspaper's former official website

2007 establishments in Switzerland
2009 disestablishments in Switzerland
Defunct free daily newspapers
Defunct newspapers published in Switzerland
German-language newspapers published in Switzerland
Newspapers published in Zürich
Publications disestablished in 2009
Publications established in 2007